Val-d'Étangson is a commune in the Sarthe department in the Pays de la Loire region in north-western France. It was established on 1 January 2019 by merger of the former communes of Évaillé (the seat) and Sainte-Osmane.

See also
Communes of the Sarthe department

References

Communes of Sarthe